Football Club Messina was an Italian football club based in Messina, Sicily, formerly known as S.S.D. Città di Messina and U.S.D. Camaro Messina, and disbanded in 2021.

History

Foundation
The club is the direct heir of U.S.D. Camaro Messina, an amateur football club from the Messina neighbourhood of Camaro that was founded in 1969.

Città di Messina
In 2010 the club was renamed to S.S.D. Città di Messina, as one of the phoenix club of F.C. Messina Peloro.

In the season 2011–12 the team was promoted from Eccellenza Sicily Group B to Serie D after playoffs.

The club escaped relegation in 2019 after winning a playoff against Locri.

Football Club Messina
In the summer of 2019, the club was acquired by supermarket entrepreneur Rocco Arena, who was also the owner of Spanish club CF Independiente Alicante (heir of Alicante CF).

On 13 July 2019, the Italian Football Federation approved a change name request for the club, which was renamed Football Club Messina, reminiscent of the similar denomination of "Football Club Messina Peloro"  club between 1997 and 2008, when they also played at Serie A level.

In the 2020–21 Serie D season, FC Messina ended in second place, behind crosstown rivals ACR Messina. They later won the Serie D Girone I playoffs, defeating Acireale in the semifinal and Gelbison in the final, thus ensuring them the right to be admitted to Serie C in case of a league vacancy.

In July 2021, following Serie D Girone A champions Gozzano's withdrawal, FC Messina applied to be readmitted to Serie C. However, the request to be readmitted was denied by the Lega Pro committee, and successively also on appeal, due to the club's inability to provide a valid surety in time.

The 2021–22 Serie D campaign saw club owner Rocco Arena relinquishing from investing in the club during the season. In December the club released most of its players and failed to show up at two consecutive league games, thus being excluded from the league with immediate effect.

Colors and badge
Its colors are yellow and red. They usually play with blue kit, to avoid getting confused with the principal team of the city, ACR Messina.

Stadium
The club originally played its home games in the old stadium of the city, the 11,900 seater Stadio Giovanni Celeste.

In 2018 the club announced their relocation to the newly rebranded "Despar Stadium" in the outskirts of the city, a football field owned by local amateur football club Camaro. However, as the stadium did not meet the minimum requirements to host Serie D games, Città di Messina is currently using the city's main venue Stadio San Filippo as its home for the beginning of the season.

References

External links
  

 
Messina
Messina
Association football clubs established in 1969
Association football clubs disestablished in 2021
1969 establishments in Italy
2021 disestablishments in Italy
Sport in Messina